Peter-Härtling-Preis is a literature prize awarded in Baden-Württemberg, Germany.

Winners 

 1984 Karin Gündisch: Geschichten über Astrid
 1986 Cordula Tollmien: La gatta heißt Katze; Reinhold Ziegler: Groß am Himmel
 1988 Margaret Klare: Heute Nacht ist viel passiert
 1990 Reinhard Burger: Der Wind und die Sterne
 1992 Josef Holub: Der rote Nepomuk
 1994 Ingrid Möller: Ein Schmetterling aus Surinam
 1996 Nina Petrick: Die Regentrinkerin
 1998 Irma Krauß: Arabella
 2000 Regine Beckmann: Angel Mike 
 2002 Martina Wildner: Jede Menge Sternschnuppen
 2005 Katrin Bongard: Radio Gaga
 2007 Christiane Thiel: Das Jahr, in dem ich 13 1/2 war
 2009 Gabi Kreslehner: Charlottes Traum
 2011 Salah Naoura: Matti und Sami
 2013 Nataly Savina: Love Alice
 2015 Regina Dürig: Eigentlich lieber nicht
 2017 Andrea Badey and Claudia Kühn: Strom auf der Tapete
 2019 Antje Herden: Keine halben Sachen mehr
 2021 Juliane Pickel: Krummer Hund

Literary awards of Baden-Württemberg
Weinheim